Jordan Michael "Jordy" Smith (born 11 February 1988) is a South African professional surfer, competing on the World championship tour surfing (WCT). In 2007 Smith won surfing's World Qualifying Series, the second-tier tour which leads to qualification for the World championship tour (WCT) surfing.

Jordy Smith won both the 2010 and 2011 Billabong J-Bay competitions in South Africa. He has also won 2014 and 2016 Hurley Pro at trestles California . In 2013 he won the Rio Pro in Brazil. All of these contests are part of the world championship tour.

Smith grew up in Durban and started surfing at age 3. He attended a local Durban high school, Glenwood High School.

Smith is known for the manoeuvres "rodeo flip" and full rotation "alley-oops'  and he has been sponsored by O'Neill since 2007.

In 2014, Smith married South African model Lyndall Jarvis.

Outside surf, Smith is a supporter of S.L. Benfica.

He has qualified to represent South Africa at the 2020 Summer Olympics.

Career victories

References

External links
 

South African surfers
World Surf League surfers
Laureus World Sports Awards winners
South African people of British descent
Sportspeople from Durban
Living people
1988 births